Young-shin is a Korean unisex given name. The meaning differs based on the hanja used to write each syllable of the name. There are 34 hanja with the reading "young" and 25 hanja with the reading "shin" on the South Korean government's official list of hanja which may be registered for use in given names.

People with this name include:
Cho Young-shin (born 1967), South Korean male handball coach
Kim Young-sin (born 1986), South Korean football player
Nam Yeong-sin (born 1990), South Korean female handball player

Fictional characters with this name include:
Lee Young-shin, in 2007 South Korean television series Thank You
Young-sin, female character in 2018 South Korean television series Mother

See also
List of Korean given names

References

Korean unisex given names